Rijk de Gooyer (17 December 1925 – 2 November 2011) was a Dutch Golden Calf-winning actor, writer, comedian and singer. From the 1950s until the early 1970s, he became well known in The Netherlands as part of a comic duo with John Kraaijkamp, Sr. In the United States best known for having small roles in films such as Nosferatu: Phantom der Nacht, Soldaat van Oranje, A Time to Die and The Wilby Conspiracy.

Biography
De Gooyer was raised in a baker's family, born as one half of a fraternal twin. In World War II he worked as an interpreter. Initially for the American 101st Airborne, later on for the British Field Security. From 1959 till 1961 de Gooyer studied at an actors school of the UFA in Berlin. During these years, he supposedly worked for the CIA as an informant. 

In the 1950s, he started a comic duo with Johnny Kraaijkamp. Thanks to their performances on TV, the duo became extremely popular. In the Johnny & Rijk shows, De Gooyer always played the part of the feeder, with Kraaijkamp providing the laughs. They split up in the 1970s, when De Gooyer focused more on his film career. 

He played in films such as Soldaat van Oranje, De Inbreker and Madelief, krassen in het tafelblad. In 1982 he won the Golden Calf for Best Actor for all his works, according to him he could have won it a year earlier but because he wasn't there it went to Rutger Hauer. In 1995 he threw his Golden Calf for Hoogste Tijd out on the street after the ceremony. De Gooyer was videotaped while he threw the award out of the window because he was on the Dutch hidden-camera show Taxi (the Dutch version of Taxicab Confessions). His (current) last Golden Calf, for Madelief, Krassen in het Tafelblad was also thrown out on the street this time by Maarten Spanjer (who hosted Taxi). De Gooyer could be seen in various Dutch commercials, for companies such as Reaal, KPN and Paturain, and for the  soda brand Sisi.

De Gooyer was the lead in In voor- en tegenspoed, the Dutch version of Johnny Speight's sitcom franchise (known in the UK as Till Death Us Do Part among other names and in the U.S. as All in the Family). De Gooyer played Fred Schuit (literally Fred Barge), the Dutch equivalent of Alf Garnett or Archie Bunker. He won a Golden Film in 1997 for the role.

Partial filmography

Het Wonderlijke leven van Willem Parel (1955) – Pianist
Kleren Maken de Man (1957) – Peter
Brainwashed (1960) – Berger's Secretary (uncredited)
Rififi in Amsterdam (1962) – De Bijenkorf
De blanke slavin (1969) – Charles Dubois
The Burglar (1972) – Willem 'Glimmie' Burg
Geen paniek (1973) – Rijk
Naked Over the Fence (1973) – Rick Lemming
The Wilby Conspiracy (1975) – Van Heerden
Zwaarmoedige verhalen voor bij de centrale verwarming (1975) – Postbode (segment "Een Winkelier Keert Niet Weerom")
Rufus (1975) – Rufus
Soldaat van Oranje (1977) – Gestapo-man Breitner
De Mantel der Liefde (1978) – Cor
Nosferatu: Phantom der Nacht (1979) – Town official
Grijpstra & De Gier (1979) – Henk Grijpstra
The Lucky Star (1980) – 1st Gestapo Officer
Het verboden bacchanaal (1981) – Kerrie-Kees van Heesteren
Een vlucht regenwulpen (1981) – Bovenmeester
Rigor mortis (1981) – Walter de Beer
Twee vorstinnen en een vorst (1981) – Laernoes
Hoge hakken, echte liefde (1981) – Semijns Roggeveen / Arie Snoek
Het 30 April-gevoel (1981) – Himself
Sabine (1982) – Nick
A Time to Die (1982) – SS Officer
De zwarte ruiter (1983) – Rinus IJzerman
Vroeger kon je lachen (1983) – Koos
An Bloem (1983) – Dik
Army Brats (1984) – Pete Stewart
Ciske de Rat (1984) – Rechercheur Muyskens
De prooi (1985) – Bob Jaspers
Teufels Großmutter (1986, TV series) – Hans Binnenbruck
In de schaduw van de overwinning (1986) – Vos
Mama is boos! (1986) – Pete Stewart
Op hoop van zegen (1986) – Clemens Bos
De ratelrat (1987) – Adjudant Grijpstra
Leedvermaak (1989) – Zwart
Evenings (1989) – Vader
Last Call (1995) – Willem 'Uli' Bouwmeester
Filmpje! (1995) – Don Gorgonzola
The Dress (1996) – Martin
Scratches in the Table (1998) – Opa
De bal (1999) – Burgemeester Karlow
Qui vive (2001) – Zwart
Happy End (2009) – Zwart (final film role)

References

External links

 
 

1925 births
2011 deaths
Deaths from cancer in the Netherlands
Deaths from pancreatic cancer
Dutch male comedians
Dutch male film actors
Dutch male singers
Dutch male radio actors
Dutch male television actors
Dutch male writers
Golden Calf winners
Actors from Utrecht (city)
20th-century Dutch people